Marie Therese Andrews (born 9 December 1940), is an Australian former politician, who was a member of the New South Wales Legislative Assembly representing the electorate of Peats for the Labor Party between 1995 and 2007 and then the electorate of Gosford from 2007 to 2011.

Prior to entering politics, Andrews was a private secretary to the NSW Branch Secretary of the Australian Railways Union (now part of the Australian Rail Tram and Bus Industry Union) for 17 years.

On 8 November 2010, Andrews announced that she would not be contesting the next state election and her seat was won by Chris Holstein of the Liberals.

Notes

 

Australian Labor Party members of the Parliament of New South Wales
Members of the New South Wales Legislative Assembly
1940 births
Living people
Australian trade unionists
21st-century Australian politicians
Women members of the New South Wales Legislative Assembly
21st-century Australian women politicians